The 13th Grand Prix du Comminges was a non-championship Formula One motor race held in Saint-Gaudens on 10 August 1947. The race was held over 30 laps and was won by Louis Chiron in a Talbot-Lago. Yves Giraud-Cabantous and Eugène Chaboud were second and third, also in Talbot-Lagos. After more than two and a half hours racing, only 0.5 seconds separated Chiron and Yves-Cabantous. Maserati drivers Luigi Villoresi and Dorino Serafini respectively started from pole position and set fastest lap but both retired in separate accidents.

Classification

References

Comminges
Comminges